Psychomotor may refer to:
 Psychomotor learning, the relationship between cognitive functions and physical movement
 Psychomotor retardation, a slowing-down of thought and a reduction of physical movements in an individual
 Psychomotor agitation, a series of unintentional and purposeless motions that stem from mental tension and anxiety of an individual